Qasim Khanate or Kingdom of Qasim or Khanate of Qasım  (Kasimovskoye khanstvo/Kasimovskoye tsarstvo) was a Tatar-ruled khanate, a vassal of Russia, which existed from 1452 until 1681 in the territory of modern Ryazan Oblast in Russia with its capital Kasimov, in the middle course of the Oka River. It was established in the lands which Grand Prince Vasily II of Moscow (reigned 1425–1462) presented in 1452 to the Kazan prince Qasim Khan (d. 1469), son of the first Kazan khan Olug Moxammat.

Pre-history
The original populations were Finnic tribes Meshchyora and Muroma, Mordvins. The land was under Kievan Rus' and Volga Bulgaria's influence. Local tribes were tributaries of Ruthenian dukes. Later, the area was incorporated into Vladimir-Suzdal. In 1152, Duke of Vladimir Yuri Dolgoruky founded Gorodets-Meshchyorskiy. After the Mongol conquest, the territory was incorporated into the territory of the Golden Horde. Turkic settlers appeared in those areas, and most of them accepted Islam under influence from the Volga Bulgars. The semi-independent principality Mishar Yurt was founded by Hordian Mohammad Shirin beg. From 1393, the area became part of Muscovy. After the battle of Suzdal in 1445, Olug Moxammad claimed to return those lands to the Tatars.

According to some historians, such as Khudyakov, Vassily executed the claim and Moxammat's son Qasim was crowned as a ruler of Meshchyora lands. The area and capital were renamed after him. Another version is that Qasim came into Russian service and was granted those lands to create a buffer state between Grand Duchy of Moscow and the Khanate of Kazan. However, the Khanate was a vassal of Russia. From the beginning, Khans governed the Khanate's territory, but the outer politics were controlled by Russia.

Population

The land was inhabited mainly by Mordvins, some of them as well as other Finnic peoples like Meshchyora and Muroma have been assimilated by Tatars and became Mishar Tatars. Later, the land was settled by the Russians. Some Kazan Tatars resettled to Qasim lands, and were called Qasim Tatars. The most of Qasim Tatars served at the khan's palace or served in the khan's military. This group had been assimilated into the Mishar Tatars, but nearby 1,000 Qasim Tatars are still living in the city of Kasimov.

The noble families were the Manghyt (Manğıt), Arghyn (Arğın), Jalair (Cälair), Qipchaq (Qıpçaq). Moscow's administrators elected the khans from ruling families of the Tatar khanates: Khanate of Kazan, the Crimean Khanate, and the Siberia Khanate.

History

Qasim khans with their guard participated in all of Moscow's raids into Kazan (1467–1469, 1487, 1552). Qasim khan Şahğäli (1515–1567) was three times crowned as Kazan khan with the aid of Muscovy. After the conquest of Kazan, the self-government of the khans was abolished and the khanate came to be governed by Russian voyevodas. However, khans still reigned. One of the khans, Simeon Bekbulatovich, was baptised and proclaimed Grand Duke of Moscow in 1574. He never really reigned and was used for a short period by Russian Tsar Ivan the Terrible as a puppet head of state. At the reign of Sayed Borhan khan (1627–1679) Russia started a policy of Christianization. Begs, who had a status equal to Boyars, were switched to Serving Tatars, equal to Dvoryans. This policy provoked a Tatar revolt in 1656. After the death of khanbika (queen) Fatima Soltan in 1681, the Khanate was abolished.

See also
List of Qasim Khans
List of Turkic dynasties and countries
List of Sunni Muslim dynasties

References

Bibliography

External links
List of Qasim rulers

 
States and territories established in 1452
States and territories disestablished in 1681
Tatar states
Mongol rump states
1681 disestablishments
History of Ryazan Oblast